

Plants

Angiosperms

Arthropods

Newly named insects

Archosauromorphs

Newly named dinosaurs

Lepidosauromorphs

Newly named plesiosaurs

Paleontologists
 Death of William Diller Matthew.

References

1930s in paleontology
Paleontology 0